Shangri-La's Barr Al Jissah Resort & Spa is a  three-hotel resort in Muscat, Oman opened in late 2005. It comprises the 180-room Al Husn ("the Castle"), 198-room Al Bandar ("the Town"), and the 302-room Al Waha.

Awards
Oman Today Best Restaurant Awards named Shangri-La's Barr Al Jissah Resort & Spa as finalist in the Ambience and Service categories.

References

External links
Shangri-La's Barr Al Jissah Resort & Spa website

2005 establishments in Oman
Hotel buildings completed in 2005
Hotels established in 2005
Hotels in Muscat, Oman
Shangri-La Hotels and Resorts